Michael Burgess may refer to:

Michael Burgess (coroner) (born 1946), Coroner of the Queen's Household since 2002
Michael Burgess (cricketer) (born 1994), English cricketer
Michael C. Burgess (born 1950), US congressman from Texas, obstetrician
Michael Burgess (singer) (1945–2015), Canadian singer/actor
Mike Burgess (footballer) (born 1932), retired Canadian-born English footballer (soccer player)
Michael E. Burgess (born 1960), American actor
Mike Burgess (Kansas politician) (born 1975), former Republican member of the Kansas House of Representatives
Mike Burgess (intelligence chief) (born c. 1966), Australian intelligence official